Skalsko may refer to:

 Skalsko (Mladá Boleslav District), Czech Republic
 Skalsko, Bulgaria